Libyan Post Telecommunications & Information Technology Company (LPTIC) (Arabic: الشركة الليبية للبريد والاتصالات وتقنية المعلومات القابضة) is a holding company, was established in accordance with the decision of the Prime Minister's number (63) for the year 2005 to be the owner of major communications companies.

Subsidiaries

Al-Bunya Investment & Services Company 
The company has been established upon a decision from the Secretary of the Board of Directors of LPTIC. The Company activities are investment, building, construction, own, maintain and operate the infrastructure facilities of the main and branch networks for the provision of telecommunications services.

Libya Post 
Libya Post Company is a Libyan joint stock company having its legal personality and independent financial liability. It is affiliated to the LPITC.

Hatif Libya 
The company has been established upon a decision from the Secretary of the Board of Directors of LPTIC, No. (4) for year 2008, for purposes of operation and maintenance of the State systems and the development of a national phone network.

The Libyan International Telecom Company 
The Libyan International Telecom Company is one of LPTIC subsidiaries, established in 2008 to take over the management of all ports, international contacts in Libya and to meet the needs of the international communications of the other subsidiaries, whether telephony or data services.

Aljeel Aljadeed 
The establishment of Aljeel Aljadeed Company was to contribute in improvement and development of the telecommunications local market, transfer & resettlement of modern technologies in the field of communications and to enable the company to compete locally and internationally, by providing all services integrated communications services, fixed line and mobile and Internet services, television broadcasting and next generation network services.

Almadar Aljadid 
Almadar Aljadid is a government owned mobile network operator and data provider based in Tripoli, Libya.

Libya Telecom & Technology

Libyana 
Libyana entered the Libyan telecommunication market with services to compete with Almadar, which was also later acquired by LPITC.

References 

Communications in Libya
Telecommunications companies of Libya
Postal organizations
Companies of Libya